Igor Valerievich Radulov (born August 23, 1982) is a Russian former professional ice hockey player.

He was drafted by the National Hockey League's Chicago Blackhawks 74th overall in the 2000 NHL Entry Draft and played 43 regular season games for the Blackhawks, scoring 9 goals and 7 assists for 16 points.  After the NHL lockout, Radulov returned to Russia with HC Spartak Moscow.  In 2006, he had short stints with Metallurg Novokuznezk of the Russian Superleague and with HC Dmitrov of the Vysshaya Liga before signing with the Superleague's Vityaz Chekhov. During the 2008-09 KHL season, Radulov signed with Salavat Yulaev Ufa.

Personal life 
He is the older brother of Alexander Radulov who plays in the Kontinental Hockey League (KHL) for Ak Bars Kazan.

Career statistics

External links

1982 births
Living people
Chicago Blackhawks draft picks
Chicago Blackhawks players
Metallurg Magnitogorsk players
Metallurg Novokuznetsk players
HC Spartak Moscow players
Lokomotiv Yaroslavl players
Mississauga IceDogs players
Norfolk Admirals players
People from Nizhny Tagil
Russian ice hockey left wingers
Salavat Yulaev Ufa players
SKA Saint Petersburg players
Severstal Cherepovets players
HC Vityaz players
Atlant Moscow Oblast players
HC Sochi players
HC Yugra players
Sportspeople from Sverdlovsk Oblast